

The Albert Leon Whiteman Memorial Prize is awarded by the American Mathematical Society for  notable exposition and exceptional scholarship in the history of mathematics. 

The prize was established in 1998 with funds provided by  Sally Whiteman in memory of her late husband Albert Leon Whiteman. Originally it was awarded every 4 years with the first prized handed out in 2001. Since 2009 the prize is awarded every 3 years and carries a prize money of $5000.

Past recipients
2001 Thomas Hawkins
2005 Harold M. Edwards
2009 Jeremy Gray
2012 Joseph Dauben
2015 Umberto Bottazzini
2018 Karen Parshall 
2021 Judith Grabiner

See also

 List of mathematics awards

References

External links
Albert Leon Whiteman Memorial Prize on the website of the American Mathematical Society

Awards of the American Mathematical Society
Triennial events
History of mathematics